Edward Baran is a British newsreader and reporter. He worked for ITV Tyne Tees from 2007 to 2008, as a newsreader on weekend editions of North East Tonight, sharing the role with reporters at the station. Since late 2008, he can be seen reporting for GMTV in London.

Education 
Edward Baran attended Leeds Grammar School and read Law at Durham University (University College), after which he gained a Postgraduate Diploma in Broadcast Journalism from City, University of London.

References

External links
GMTV

Living people
English television journalists
British television newsreaders and news presenters
GMTV presenters and reporters
ITV regional newsreaders and journalists
Year of birth missing (living people)
People educated at Leeds Grammar School
Alumni of University College, Durham